Dilnigar Ilhamjan, also known as Dinigeer Yilamujiang, is a Chinese cross-country skier of Uyghur ethnicity, born in Altay, Xinjiang. She is the first Chinese cross-country skier to win a medal in an ISF event. She made her maiden Olympic appearance during the 2022 Winter Olympics, where she was one of the two last torch bearers.

Early life
Her father, who taught her to ski, received a bronze medal in the 1993 national cross-country skiing competition.

Sports career 
Originally competing as a track and field athlete, she started learning to ski when she was 12. She primarily pursued cross-country skiing initially as a hobby before transforming herself into an elite-level competitor. She took part in local events in 2012 and later engaged in competitive skiing events. She first started skiing competitively in 2017. Norwegian coach Kristian Bjune Sveen travelled to Xinjiang to give her training, while Dilnigar also spent 3 years training in Norway herself, alongside Bayani Jialin, a Chinese skier of Kazakh ethnicity. She placed 2nd at the FIS China City Sprint Beijing 2019, as well as 2nd at the Norwegian Norgescup at Konnerud.

In 2019, she won a silver medal at the FIS Beijing Cross Country Skiing Points Grand Prix.

2022 Winter Olympics 

At the 2022 Winter Olympics opening ceremony, she was one of the two last torch bearers, lighting the Olympic cauldron alongside Zhao Jiawen. She became the first Uyghur and the first from Altay, the likely origin of skiing, to light the cauldron. Due to earlier backlash surrounding the Xinjiang internment camps and Uyghur genocide, there was some speculation about the message China was intending to send with Dinigeer's selection. Her selection sparked condemnation from human rights groups accusing China of politicizing the Olympics.

However, the International Olympic Committee welcomed and defended the decision of China to select her as one of the torchbearers of the opening ceremony and insisted that since she was one of the participants, she had the right to compete and take part in any ceremony.

She competed in the women's 15km skiathlon event and placed 43rd. After the match, she exited through a separate aisle, without passing through the mixed zone where she could be interviewed by the press. She was scheduled to race in the women's 4 x 5 km relay on 12 February, but never showed up. Unnamed sources claimed that she was physically and mentally exhausted from 'having the eyes of the world on her.' She participated in the women's 30km freestyle event on the last day of competition.

References

External links 
 Dinigeer Yilamujiang  at Beijing 2022
 

Chinese female cross-country skiers
2001 births
Living people
Cross-country skiers at the 2022 Winter Olympics
Olympic cross-country skiers of China
People from Altay Prefecture
Uyghur sportspeople
Olympic cauldron lighters